Vivian Teed (1934 - 6 May 1958) was the last person to be hanged in Wales. He was charged with the murder of 73-year-old William Williams on 15 November 1957.

References

1934 births
1958 deaths
People executed by hanging